Willie Messino (–2002) was an enforcer and adviser to top Mafia bosses in the Chicago Outfit. He was known as "Wee Willie" because of his small stature. Despite his diminutive frame, Messino had a reputation as a decidedly violent enforcer.

In the 1960s, he worked for Tony Accardo and Joseph Gagliano. In 1970, he was sent to prison after being convicted of kidnapping and beating contractors George and Jack Chiagouris, brothers who owed money to the mob. After his release in December 1976, he went to work as an adviser to Marco D'Amico and then to Outfit chief Jackie Cerone. Messino's name came up again in the late 1980s when a wiretap picked up mob associate Mario Rainone expressing his concerns to Lenny Patrick that Rudy Fratto and Messino were intending to kill him. He is thought to have proposed The Cassano Brothers, Dominick, Vito, Gino and Angelo (deceased) for induction into the Outfit in the late 1990's. He died in 2002.

References

1917 births
2002 deaths
American gangsters of Italian descent
Chicago Outfit mobsters